Johann "Hans" Kudlich (October 23, 1823 – November 10, 1917
) (Americanized as John) was an Austrian political activist, Austrian legislator, American immigrant, writer, and physician.

Early life
Kudlich was born in Upper Silesian Úvalno Lobenstein near Opava, the Czech Republic (which was a part of the Austrian Empire at that time) on October 23, 1823 in to a peasant family.

Political life

He is noted for being a leader of the revolutionary movement to end the feudal policies of the Austrian Empire under Ferdinand I of Austria. From the 1700s, the empire had enforced a decree known as the Robot Patent which required farmers to serve an annual quota of labor without compensation to the noble landowners. Kudlich was elected to the Austrian Reichstag (parliament) in early 1848 at the age of 25. He introduced a bill to abolish forced servitude and the bill was approved by the legislature.

The parliament was dissolved by force on March 7, 1849 when the rebellion that had briefly taken control of Vienna was crushed. Kudlich up to the time of the dissolution of the parliament had worked to rally support for the revolution. After the dissolution of the parliament he fled first to Germany and then to Switzerland.

After his political career, Kudlich obtained a medical degree in Berne and Zurich.
He left Switzerland in 1853, emigrated to the United States, and settled in Hoboken, New Jersey.
He worked as a medical doctor, and co-founded the Hoboken Academy in 1861, a German-American school (later merged with the Stevens Preparatory School, later Stevens Academy, which ceased in 1974).

Death

Kudlich died November 11, 1917 in Hoboken, New Jersey, USA. In 1925 the ashes of him and his wife, Louisa Kudlich (née Vogt) were interred in the Mausoleum at the base of the Hans Kudlich Lookout tower. The tower is located in Úvalno (Kudlich's birthplace) in what is now the Czech Republic.

Books by Hans Kudlich
 ,  (Retrospectives and Memories of Hans Kudlich, With the Author's Portrayals). 3 vols, Vienna-Leipzig-Budapest, 1873.
  (The Revolution of 1848). Leitmeritz, 1913.

See also
 Revolutions of 1848

References

External links

 http://www.germanheritage.com/biographies/atol/kudlich.html
 http://www.ohio.edu/chastain/ip/kudlich.htm
 Hans Kudlich papers

1823 births
1917 deaths
People from Bruntál District
People from Austrian Silesia
Silesian-German people
Members of the Imperial Diet (Austria)
19th-century Austrian physicians
Forty-Eighters
Austrian Empire emigrants to the United States
Physicians from New Jersey
University of Vienna alumni